The Betty Gordon books were an early Stratemeyer Syndicate series, published under the pseudonym Alice B. Emerson.

Ghostwriters
Edward Stratemeyer created the series and wrote plot outlines for books by a number of ghostwriters. Josephine Lawrence wrote the first four volumes in the series, as well as volumes 7 and 9. Titles 5 and 6 were written by W. Bert Foster, number 8 by Elizabeth M. Duffield Ward and numbers 10 through 15 by Eunice W. Creager.

Titles
 Betty Gordon at Bramble Farm, or, The mystery of a nobody, 1920
 Betty Gordon in Washington, or, Strange adventures in a great city, 1920
 Betty Gordon in the Land of Oil, or, The farm that was worth a fortune, 1920
 Betty Gordon at Boarding School, or, The treasure of Indian Chasm, 1921
 Betty Gordon at Mountain Camp, or, The mystery of Ida Bellethorne, 1922
 Betty Gordon at Ocean Park, or, School chums on the boardwalk, 1923
 Betty Gordon and her School Chums; or, Bringing the rebels to terms, 1924
 Betty Gordon at Rainbow Ranch; or, Cowboy Joe's secret, 1925
 Betty Gordon in Mexican Wilds; or, The secret of the mountains, 1926
 Betty Gordon and the Lost Pearls; or, A mystery of the seaside, 1927
 Betty Gordon on the Campus; or, The secret of the trunk room, 1928
 Betty Gordon and the Hale Twins; or, An exciting vacation, 1929
 Betty Gordon at Mystery Farm; or, Strange doings at Rocky Ridge, 1930
 Betty Gordon on No-trail Island; or, Uncovering a queer secret, 1931
 Betty Gordon and the Mystery Girl; or, The secret at Sundown Hall, 1932

References

Further reading
 Emerson, Alice B. Betty Gordon at Bramble Farm. http://www.readseries.com/joslaw/bgch1.htm

External links
 

Book series introduced in 1920
Stratemeyer Syndicate
Juvenile series
Gordon, Betty